3 Balloons is an album by comedian/musician Stephen Lynch. According to his official website, it was first studio album since 2000's A Little Bit Special. As of 5 March 2009, it is available for purchase in MP3 format directly from WhatAreRecords.com. It was made available from other on-line stores starting the following week of March 2009. CDs were made available for sale at shows and on-line shortly after that, and it was released in stores starting 24 March.

On his official site, Lynch says:

Most professional news sources did not review the album, with the notable exception of Allmusic's positive review, stating: "Love him or hate him — and that really does seem all there is to choose from — 3 Balloons finds novelty songster Stephen Lynch on a roll, keeping the quality high even when the formula is the same it has been for the past decade."

The album cover is a visual parody of the artwork design for the T. Rex album Electric Warrior.

Track list

Personnel
 Stephen Lynch – acoustic guitar, vocals
 Dean Sharenow – drums
 Ivan Bodley – bass
 Rich Campbell – piano
 Erik Della Penna – electric guitar, cigar box guitars
 Jonathan Dinklage – violin, viola, string arrangements
 Dave Eggar – cello
 Rod Cone and David Josefsberg – additional vocals

References

2009 albums
Stephen Lynch (musician) albums
2000s comedy albums